Pantelis Kouros (10 December 1932 – 8 May 2021) was a Greek Cypriot politician.

Biography
Kouros was born in Nicosia in 1932, where he attended Pancyprian Gymnasium. He earned degrees in public relations and business administration. In 1969, he became a close associate of Glafcos Clerides, who founded Eniaion. He joined Clerides' office when the latter became President.

From 1976 to 1993, he directed the political office of the Democratic Rally party. He remained in the position until the end of Clerides' term in 2003.

Pantelis Kouros died on 8 May 2021 at the age of 88.

References

1932 births
2021 deaths
Cypriot politicians
Greek Cypriot people
People from Nicosia
Democratic Rally politicians